Coming of age is a young person's formal transition from adolescence to adulthood.

Coming of Age may also refer to:

Film and television 
 Coming of Age (1938 film), a British film by H. Manning Haynes
 Coming of Age (1984 film), an Australian film
 Coming of Age (2015 film), a South African film
 Coming of Age (1988 TV series), an American sitcom
 Coming of Age (2008 TV series), a British sitcom
 "Coming of Age" (Degrassi: The Next Generation)
 "Coming of Age" (Star Trek: The Next Generation)

Music 
 Coming of Age (group), a 1990s American R&B group

Albums
 Coming of Age (Five Man Electrical Band album)
 Coming of Age (Camel album)
 Coming of Age (Memphis Bleek album)
 Coming of Age (Breaking Point album)
 Coming of Age (Jude Johnstone album)
 A Coming of Age, an album by Lucky Soul
 Come of Age, The Vaccines album

Songs
 "Coming of Age" (Foster the People song)
 "Coming of Age", a song by Dodie Stevens, B-side of "Pink Shoelaces"
 "Coming of Age", a song by Five Man Electrical Band, B-side of "The Devil And Miss Lucy"
 "Coming of Age", a song by Any Trouble, B-side of "Open Fire" 
 "Coming of Age", a song by Damn Yankees from Damn Yankees
 "Coming of Age", a song by Camel from Harbour of Tears
 "Coming of Age", a song by Jay-Z from Reasonable Doubt

Books
 The Coming of Age (book), a 1970 book by Simone de Beauvoir
 Coming of Age (book), a 1999 photographic art book by Will McBride

Other uses 
 Coming of Age (Unitarian Universalism), a program within Unitarian Universalist congregations

See also 
 Legal age
 Coming-of-age story, a literature and film genre